The C. A. Elster Building is a historic commercial building located at the corner of California State Route 190 and Tule River Dr. in Springville, California.

Description and history 
The brick building was built in 1912 by Charles Alonzo Elster, a significant businessman in the area. When it opened, the building contained several of Springville's main businesses, including its post office, a bank, a drugstore, the Odd Fellows hall, and the town's first telephone. The second floor of the building was used for residences, and the basement contained Springville's first ice plant.

The building was added to the National Register of Historic Places on March 25, 1982.

References

External links

Commercial buildings on the National Register of Historic Places in California
Commercial buildings completed in 1912
Buildings and structures in Tulare County, California
National Register of Historic Places in Tulare County, California
1912 establishments in California